Chamila may refer to:

 Chamila people, an ethnic group of Colombia
 Chamila language, language of Colombia
An Indian given name
A Sri Lankan given name

People with the name 
 Jagath Chamila, Sri Lankan actor
 Chamila Gamage, Sri Lankan cricketer
 Chamila Gamage, Sri Lankan contemporary artist

Sinhalese unisex given names